Roddy Paterson (born 23 June 1993) is a Scottish professional footballer who plays for Petershill F.C. as a forward

Career

Ayr United
Paterson signed for Ayr United on the 21 October 2009. On 24 July 2010, he made his first team debut as a substitute in the Challenge Cup with his Scottish Second Division debut coming on 7 August 2010 against Brechin City at Somerset Park. In all he made four appearances in his debut season.

A regular scorer for Ayr's reserves he scored his first professional goal in his first start on 9 August 2011, a 3–0 win over Raith Rovers in the Challenge Cup. Following Ayr's promotion he made his Scottish First Division debut as a substitute against Queen of the South on 24 September in a 1–0 win.

In January 2013, Paterson signed with Troon F.C., who he helped to promotion after finishing 2nd in the Ayrshire league in the 2012/13 season.
He is now with Lugar Boswell in the Ayrshire league.

On 6 December 2018, Paterson signed with Irvine Meadow.

He is now with Petershill FC

Career statistics

References

1993 births
Scottish footballers
Living people
Ayr United F.C. players
Troon F.C. players
Scottish Football League players
Lugar Boswell Thistle F.C. players
Association football forwards